Hyarotis adrastus, the tree flitter, is a butterfly belonging to the family Hesperiidae found in South Asia and Southeast Asia.

Description

Distribution
Bengal. (Moore in P. Z. S.) Recorded from Ceylon (Hutchison, Wade, Mackwood); Andamans, Cachar (Wood-Mason and de Nicéville); Sikkim (de Nicéville; Elwes); Calcutta (de Nicéville); Kumaon (Doherty); Kangra, N.-W. Himalayas (Moore) Orissa (Taylor); Nilgiris (Hampson).Burma, Andamans, Thailand, Laos, Vietnam, Hainan, Hong Kong, Malaysia, Tioman, Singapore, Borneo, Sumatra, Java, Palawan, Philippines.

References

Hesperiinae
Butterflies of Asia
Butterflies of Singapore
Butterflies of Indochina
Taxa named by Pieter Cramer